Wellsburg is an unincorporated community in Liberty Township, Wells County, in the U.S. state of Indiana.

History
A post office was established at Wellsburg in 1870, and remained in operation until 1873.

Geography

References

Unincorporated communities in Wells County, Indiana
Unincorporated communities in Indiana